This is an incomplete list of species in the genus Hygrocybe. The genus has a widespread distribution and contains about 150 species.

Hygrocybe acutoconica - persistent waxcap (Europe, North America)
Hygrocybe albomarginata - (Puerto Rico)
Hygrocybe anomala - (Australia)
Hygrocybe aphylla - (Ecuador)
Hygrocybe appalachianensis - Appalachian waxy cap (eastern United States) 
Hygrocybe astatogala - (Australia, Madagascar, Central Africa, Philippines)
Hygrocybe aurantiosplendens - orange waxcap (Europe, North America)
Hygrocybe aurantipes  - (Australia)
Hygrocybe austrolutea - (Australia)
Hygrocybe austropratensis - (Australia)
Hygrocybe batesii - (Australia)
Hygrocybe batistae - (Puerto Rico)
Hygrocybe bolensis - (Australia)
Hygrocybe boothii - (Australia)
Hygrocybe brunneosquamosa - (Puerto Rico)
Hygrocybe calciphila - limestone waxcap (Europe)
Hygrocybe cantharellus - (North America)
Hygrocybe ceracea - butter waxcap (Europe)
Hygrocybe chloochlora - (Puerto Rico)
Hygrocybe chlorophana - golden waxcap (Europe, North America, northern Asia)
Hygrocybe cinereofirma - (Puerto Rico)
Hygrocybe citrinovirens - citrine waxcap (Europe)
Hygrocybe coccinea - scarlet waxcap or scarlet hood (Europe, North America, Australia)
Hygrocybe coccineocrenata - bog waxcap (Europe)
Hygrocybe collucera (Australia)
Hygrocybe conica - blackening waxcap or witch's hat (Europe, North America, Australia)
Hygrocybe conicoides - dune waxcap (Europe)
Hygrocybe constrictospora - hourglass waxcap (Europe)
Hygrocybe corsica - (France)
Hygrocybe erythrocala - (Australia)
Hygrocybe flavescens - (North America)
Hygrocybe flavifolia - (North America)
Hygrocybe flavocampanulata - (Puerto Rico, Trinidad)
Hygrocybe fuhreri - (Australia)
Hygrocybe fulgens - (Slovakia)
Hygrocybe glutinipes - glutinous waxcap (Europe)
Hygrocybe griseoramosa - (Australia)
Hygrocybe helobia - garlic waxcap (Europe)
Hygrocybe hypohaemacta - (Jamaica, U.S. Virgin Islands)
Hygrocybe insipida - spangle waxcap (Europe)
Hygrocybe intermedia - fibrous waxcap (Europe)
Hygrocybe kula - (Australia)
Hygrocybe lanecovensis - (Australia)
Hygrocybe laboyi - (Puerto Rico)
Hygrocybe lepida - goblet waxcap (Europe)
Hygrocybe manadukaensis - (Western Ghats, India)
Hygrocybe miniata- vermilion waxcap (Europe)
Hygrocybe miniatofirma - (Puerto Rico)
Hygrocybe monscaiensis - (Spain) 
Hygrocybe mucronella - bitter waxcap (Europe)
Hygrocybe natarajanii - (India)
Hygrocybe neofirma - (Puerto Rico, Guadeloupe)
Hygrocybe noelokelani - (Hawaii)
Hygrocybe olivaceofirma - (Puerto Rico)
Hygrocybe pakelo - (Hawaii)
Hygrocybe phaeococcinea - shadowed waxcap (Europe)
Hygrocybe prieta - (Puerto Rico)
Hygrocybe procera - red waxcap (New Zealand)
Hygrocybe punicea - crimson waxcap (Europe, North America?)
Hygrocybe quieta - oily waxcap (Europe)
Hygrocybe reesiae - (Australia)
Hygrocybe reidii - honey waxcap (Europe, North America?)
Hygrocybe rhodophylla- (Italy)
Hygrocybe rubida - (India)
Hygrocybe salicis-herbaceae - mountain waxcap (Europe)
Hygrocybe saltirivula - (Australia)
Hygrocybe spadicea - date waxcap (Europe)
Hygrocybe splendidissima - splendid waxcap (Europe)
Hygrocybe striatella - (Chile)
Hygrocybe subpapillata - papillate waxcap (Europe)
Hygrocybe substrangulata - waisted waxcap (Europe)
Hygrocybe turunda - singed waxcap (Europe)
Hygrocybe umbilicata - (Bangladesh)
Hygrocybe trinitensis - (Puerto Rico)
Hygrocybe virescens - lime-green waxy cap (North America)

References

Hygrocybe